Dragomir Herendić, known by his stage name Dragianni, is a Croatian guitarist, sound engineer, and record producer.

Career 
In 1999, Herendić joined the Bosnian garage rock band Zabranjeno Pušenje. He performed, recorded and produced their seventh studio albums Bog vozi Mercedes (2001), as well as on a live album; Live in St. Louis (2004). He left the band in 2004.

Discography 
Zabranjeno pušenje
 Bog vozi Mercedes (2001) 
 Live in St. Louis (2004)

References

External links
 Dragomir Herendic Discography at Discogs
  

Year of birth missing (living people)
Living people
Croatian guitarists
Croatian record producers
Croatian rock musicians
Zabranjeno pušenje members
21st-century guitarists